The Long Road Home is a 1998 romance novel written by Danielle Steel. The book was released to commercial success, despite receiving unfavorable critical reviews. It is Steel's 42nd novel.

Plot
Gabriella Harrison, a child of the fifties, suffers abuse from the hands of her mother, Eloise, who explains her abuse as disciplining Gabriella for being so bad. Frequent beatings mar her life. Her father scared of annoying her mother plays a spectator to all the evil happenings. Before Gabbie turns thirteen her father, tired of his wife's constant abuse towards their daughter, leaves. Her mother as always accuses Gabbie's badness for her father's departure. She says it's only because of her badness that her parents hate her, and that is exactly why her father has left them. Gabbie is then gotten rid of at a nunnery to finish out her education by her mother so she can abandon the biggest disappointment in her life.

While there, Gabriella decides she wants to become a nun. In the course of being a postulant, she falls in love with a priest, Father Joe Connors. They want to move into the real world to live their life loving each other, but the priest is not confident about making it in the real world for Gabbie and the symbol of their love growing in Gabbie's womb. Incidentally the priest commits suicide with a turmoil for he cannot break the promise made to the brotherhood of serving the needed, and for he cannot live without Gabriella. Gabriella thus loses her love, and then their child in a miscarriage. Ultimately she is compelled to leave the convent for the sin committed.

Cast out into society, Gabbie is determined to move on and finds an apartment where the tenants welcome the young woman lovingly, particularly an old professor. Everything seems to be going well; Gabbie has a job at a pastry shop, but loses it when she defends a child whose mother dislocates her arm in a fit of impatience. Eventually she finds a job at a book store whilst buying a Christmas present to her doting friend, the old professor.

Gabbie also meets a new tenant named Steve Porter in the boarding house. She initially does not approve of him, but eventually falls for him. She has a long relationship with him. He does not have a job and is constantly after Gabbie to give him money. She obliges, until the day he steals from her. He turns out to be a con artist, wanted by the police for stealing money from several people. When she learns of this, he demands she give him most of the money the old professor leaves her when he dies. She refuses to give him any money after learning his true face and about him being responsible for the professor's death. He then beats her up, nearly killing her. Gabbie is taken to a hospital, where she becomes friends with a Doctor Peter presiding over her. They like each other. But before moving on with her life with Peter, Gabriella decides to meet her parents and ask them the long avoided question - why they abandoned her and never loved her.

Towards the end of the book Gabbie visits her father hoping to get some answers on why he allowed her mother to treat her so horribly. Her father offers no answer except that he was weak. Gabbie then visits her stepfather and his new wife where it is learned that her mother never changed her bitter ways till the end and even went so far as to verbally abuse her new husband until she died of cancer. At last, after realizing that it was not her fault that her parents never loved her, she lets go of the past and moves on with her life with her new love - the doctor by her side.

Reception
Publishers Weekly gave the book an unfavorable review, remarking that "The inevitable happy ending, when it finally arrives, can't make up for a plodding narrative lacking in any real suspense."
The Kirkus Review offered a similar review, stating "Steel goes to battle with yet another worthy cause, but her good intentions this time fizzle in a sea of Åber-melodrama."

References

1998 American novels
Novels by Danielle Steel
Delacorte Press books
American romance novels